Matsudaira Yorihiro may refer to:

 Matsudaira Yorihiro (Moriyama) (1703-1763)
 Matsudaira Yorihiro (Takamatsu) (1798–1842)
 Yorihiro Matsudaira (1909–1990)